The Daily Pennsylvanian, Inc. is the independent student media organization of the University of Pennsylvania. The DP, Inc. publishes The Daily Pennsylvanian newspaper, 34th Street Magazine, and Under the Button, as well as five newsletters: The Daily Pennsylvanian, The Weekly Roundup, The Toast, Quaker Nation, and Penn, Unbuttoned.  

The Daily Pennsylvanian is published in print once per week when the university is in session, by a staff of more than 300 students. Content is also published online on a daily basis. 34th Street Magazine, an arts and culture magazine, which is published once a month in print, and Under the Button, a satirical publication, also regularly publish content online. The organization operates three principal websites: thedp.com, 34st.com, and underthebutton.com. It has received various collegiate journalism awards.

History
The Daily Pennsylvanian was founded in 1885 as a successor to the University Magazine, a publication by the Philomathean Society. The newspaper has been published daily since 1894, except for a hiatus from May 1943 to November 1945 on account of World War II. The DP broke away from the university in 1962 to become an independent publication, incorporating in 1984 to solidify its financial and editorial independence from the university. Also in 1962 the previously all-male daily began to accept female students. Among the early few women were Mary Selman Hadar, formerly an editor at The Washington Post; Clara Bargellini, today a professor of art at the National Autonomous University of Mexico; and Susan Nagler Perloff, a Philadelphia freelance writer. Today the newspaper's budget is funded primarily through the sale of advertising by professional and student staff.

Description
The DP is sometimes called Penn's "unofficial journalism department," because the university has no journalism department (though it does have the prestigious Annenberg School for Communication), and because many of its staff members go on to pursue careers in the print, broadcast, and digital media. DP alumni can be found at a number of major daily newspapers and national magazines, including The Wall Street Journal, The New York Times, The Washington Post, Forbes, the Los Angeles Times, The Philadelphia Inquirer, Time, and Business Week.

Awards

In 2008, the DP was awarded the Society of Professional Journalists' National Mark of Excellence Award. In the same year, the paper won the Spring 2008 Columbia Gold Crown, awarded to eight college newspapers nationwide. It received first place in the Associated Collegiate Press's Kansas City Convention Best of Show Competition in 2008. The DP won the Pacemaker, awarded by the Associated Collegiate Press and the Newspaper Association of America Foundation in 1990, 1997, 1998, 2000-2004, 2007, 2017, 2018, and 2019. It was ranked as the "most read" college newspaper by The Princeton Review in 1990, 1997, 1998, and 2001. In 2006, College Publisher awarded the DP first place in the category of Best Online Sports Coverage and, in 2008, it was awarded an online Gold Crown for thedp.com.

Notable former staff members 
George Wharton Pepper 1887 (DP Editor-in-Chief), U.S. Senator from Pennsylvania
Josiah Penniman 1890 (DP Editor-in-Chief), Provost of the University of Pennsylvania
Owen Roberts 1895 (DP Editor-in-Chief), associate justice, U.S. Supreme Court
Josiah McCracken 1900 (DP Associate Editor), physician; silver and bronze medalist, 1900 Summer Olympics
Wilson Hobson Jr. '24 (DP Editorial Board), bronze medalist, 1932 Summer Olympics
John Haines Ware III '30 (DP staff), U.S. Representative from Pennsylvania
Charles Addams '33 (DP staff), cartoonist
Robert Elegant '46, journalist known for his coverage of the Korean and Vietnam Wars
Leonard Lauder '54 (DP staff), chairman and CEO, Estée Lauder Companies
Frank Dolson, '54, Philadelphia Inquirer sports writer
Gaeton Fonzi, '57, reporter and editor for Philadelphia Magazine
Michael Stuart Brown '62 (DP Editor-in-Chief), geneticist and physician; 1985 Nobel Prize in Physiology or Medicine
Claudia Cohen '62 (DP Exec. Editor), gossip columnist, socialite, and television reporter
Richard Fisher '63 (DP Exec. Editor), New York real estate developer
Dan Rottenberg '64 (DP sports editor), journalist, editor and author of 10 books 
Lee Eisenberg (author), '68 (DP reporter), editor, Esquire magazine
Arnold Eisen '73 (DP reporter), chancellor, Jewish Theological Seminary
Maurice Obstfeld '73 (DP Editor-in-Chief), chief economist, International Monetary Fund
Benjamin Ginsberg '74 (DP Editor-in-Chief), partner, Patton Boggs
Buzz Bissinger '76 (DP Editorial Page Editor), author, Friday Night Lights; 1987 Pulitzer Prize for Investigative Reporting
David A. Gross '76, (DP staff) U.S. ambassador
Erik Larson '76, (DP staff) author, The Devil in the White City
Steve Stecklow '76 (DP reporter/columnist), global investigative reporter, Reuters; 2019 Pulitzer Prize for International Reporting 2007 Pulitzer Prize for Public Service
Lisa Scottoline '77 (DP staff), author of legal thrillers
Dave Lieber '79 (DP columnist), columnist, The Dallas Morning News
Richard Stevenson '81 (DP Exec. Editor), Washington editor, The New York Times
Ken Rosenthal '84 (DP Sports Writer), sportswriter, reporter, and sportscaster for Fox Sports
Stefan Fatsis '85, former Wall Street Journal reporter; author, Word Freak
Jean Chatzky '86, financial editor, TODAY Show
Jeffrey Goldberg '87 (DP Exec. Editor), Editor-in-Chief, The Atlantic; 2003 National Magazine Award
Gene Sperling '87 (DP columnist), former director, United States National Economic Council
Alan Schwarz '90, reporter for The New York Times
Cenk Uygur '92 (DP columnist), host of TheYoungTurks
Harold Ford Jr. '92 (DP columnist), U.S. Representative from Tennessee
Helen Gym '93 (34th Street Editor), Philadelphia City Council
Matt Selman '93 (34th Street Editor), producer, The Simpsons
Stephen Glass '94 (DP Exec. Editor), disgraced former New Republic writer
Josh Tyrangiel '94 (34th Street Editor), editor, Bloomberg Businessweek
Charles Ornstein '96 (DP Exec. Editor), senior reporter, ProPublica; 2005 Pulitzer Prize for Public Service
Josh Heald '00 (34th Street Editor), writer and producer, Hot Tub Time Machine and Cobra Kai
Binyamin Appelbaum '01 (DP Exec. Editor), editor, The New York Times
Ashley Parker '05 (DP and 34th Street features editor and writer), reporter, The Washington Post

References

External links
 Digitized archive of the Daily Pennsylvanian, c/o Van Pelt Library, University of Pennsylvania
 Home Page of The Daily Pennsylvanian
 Home Page of 34th Street Magazine (affiliate of The Daily Pennsylvanian)
 College Papers Grow Up (Newsweek article)
 Photography Department Blog (maintained by current and past Photo Editors)

Newspapers published in Philadelphia
Publications established in 1885
University of Pennsylvania
Student newspapers published in Pennsylvania
1885 establishments in Pennsylvania
Daily newspapers published in Pennsylvania